

The NASA Clean Air Study was a project led by the National Aeronautics and Space Administration (NASA) in association with the Associated Landscape Contractors of America (ALCA) in 1989, to research ways to clean the air in sealed environments such as space stations. Its results suggested that, in addition to absorbing carbon dioxide and releasing oxygen through photosynthesis, certain common indoor plants may also provide a natural way of removing volatile organic pollutants (benzene, formaldehyde, and trichloroethylene were tested).

These results are not applicable to typical buildings, where outdoor-to-indoor air exchange already removes VOCs at a rate that could only be matched by the placement of 10–1000 plants/m of a building's floor space.

The results also failed to replicate in future studies, with a 2014 review stating that:

List of plants studied

The following plants were tested during the initial 1989 study:

Variegated snake plant / mother-in-law's tongue (Sansevieria trifasciata laurentii)
English ivy (Hedera helix)
Peace lily (Spathiphyllum 'Mauna Loa')
Chinese evergreen (Aglaonema modestum)
Bamboo palm (Chamaedorea seifrizii) 
Red-edged dracaena, marginata (Dracaena marginata) 
Cornstalk dracaena, mass cane/corn cane (Dracaena fragrans 'Massangeana') 
Weeping fig (Ficus benjamina)
Barberton daisy, gerbera daisy (Gerbera jamesonii) 
Florist's chrysanthemum, pot mum (Chrysanthemum morifolium) 
Janet Craig (Dracaena deremensis "Janet Craig")
Warneckei (Dracaena deremensis "Warneckei")

Study Summary Table

Plants studied in various similar studies on air filtration.

Additional research
Since the release of the initial 1989 study, titled A study of interior landscape plants for indoor air pollution abatement: An Interim Report, further research has been done including a 1993 paper and 1996 book by B. C. Wolverton, the primary researcher on the original NASA study, that listed additional plants and focused on the removal of specific chemicals.  A different study in 2004 has also shown that the micro-organisms in the soil of a potted plant remove benzene from the air, and that some plant species themselves also contribute to removing benzene.

See also
 Dracaena reflexa
 Green wall
 Indoor air quality
 Phytoremediation
 Rain garden
 Sick building syndrome

References

External links
 'Interior Landscape Plants for Indoor Air Pollution'
 How to Grow Your Own Fresh Air – TED 2009. An extension of the TED Talk.

Soil science-related lists
Lists of plants
Building biology
1989 works
NASA